In graph theory, the Tutte matrix A of a graph G = (V, E) is a matrix used to determine the existence of a perfect matching: that is, a set of edges which is incident with each vertex exactly once.

If the set of vertices is  then the Tutte matrix is an n × n matrix A with entries

 

where the xij are indeterminates.  The determinant of this skew-symmetric matrix is then a polynomial (in the variables xij, i < j ): this coincides with the square of the pfaffian of the matrix A and is non-zero (as a polynomial) if and only if a perfect matching exists.  (This polynomial is not the Tutte polynomial of G.)

The Tutte matrix is named after W. T. Tutte, and is a generalisation of the Edmonds matrix for a balanced bipartite graph.

References

 

Algebraic graph theory
Matching (graph theory)
Matrices